Bhupen Baro   is an Indian politician member of United People's Party Liberal from Assam.  He is an MLA, elected from the  Barama constituency in the 2021 Assam Legislative Assembly election.

References 

Living people
People from Baksa district
Assam MLAs 2021–2026
Year of birth missing (living people)